Kulttuuritalo is a building in Alppila, Helsinki, Finland. The building was designed by Alvar Aalto, and is considered to be one of his main works.

The building 
The building combines a concert hall, an office building and a lecture-theatre block connecting the two. Uniting the whole, along the street frontage, is a  canopy.

History 
Kulttuuritalo was originally built for Finnish Communist cultural organizations. Aalto designed the building pro bono and was given complete artistic freedom; the construction work was done largely by volunteers. Work began in 1955, and the building was opened in 1958.

The building was owned by the Communist Party by a nonprofit foundation until the 1990, when the bankruptcy of the Finnish Communist Party forced its sale.

Today its owned by the government owned Senate Properties. The building is protected by a decision made by the Finnish Council of State in 1989.

Famous artists who have played at the venue include Jimi Hendrix in 1967, Cream in 1967, Led Zeppelin in 1970, Frank Zappa & Queen in 1974, AC/DC in 1977, Ramones in 1977 and 1990, Tina Turner in 1982, Metallica in 1984, Hanoi Rocks and Leonard Cohen in 1985, Johnny Winter in 1987, Iron Maiden in 1995, Lady Gaga in 2009, Stratovarius and Helloween in 2010. Frank Zappa played 3 concerts in September 1974, that were released as an album in the early 1990s.

References

Further reading 
 Karl Fleig, Alvar Aalto, (1974), p33. interior photo of auditorium, p32. exterior photo of entry canopy, p31.
 Peter Gossel and Gabrile Leuthauser, Architecture in the Twentieth Century, (1991), exterior photo of wall, p243.
 Malcolm Quantrill, Alvar Aalto: A Critical Study, (1983), exterior color photo of roof and brick detail, fig VIII.

External links 
 
 

Buildings and structures in Helsinki
Concert halls in Finland
Event venues established in 1958
Event venues in Finland
Tourist attractions in Helsinki
Alvar Aalto buildings